Esther Hamerman (born Esther Wachsmann) (1886-1977) was an American painter. Hamerman, who was self-taught, has been described as a "leading practitioner" of memory painting. She is considered a folk artist.

Early life
Esther was born in 1886 in Wieliczka, Poland into a Jewish family. She had 13 siblings. By the age of 18 she was married. She had four children and the family lived in Vienna.

In 1938, the family fled Vienna because of the Anschluss. For six years they lived in a British internment camp in Trinidad.

Immigration to the United States and career

In 1944 the Hamerman family was released from the camp and moved to New York City. Esther started painting after moving to New York. Her daughter Helen Breger and her husband, Leonard, supported Hamerman's career and submitted a painting of hers to an exhibition at ACA Galleries. That exhibition was her "big break" into the art world.

Hamerman's husband died in 1950. As a result, she relocated with her daughter and son-in-law to San Francisco, where she continued to paint.

Later life

She moved back to New York in 1963. She lived with her other daughter, Nadja Merino-Kalfel. She died in 1977 in New York. Her grand-granddaughter is artist Nicole Eisenman.

Collections
"Untitled (East River)", after 1950, oil on canvas; Smithsonian American Art Museum

References

1886 births
1977 deaths
American women painters
Polish women painters
Artists from New York City
People from Wieliczka
Jewish women painters
Jewish painters
Austrian emigrants to the United States